The labia majora (singular: labium majus) are two prominent longitudinal cutaneous folds that extend downward and backward from the mons pubis to the perineum. Together with the labia minora they form the labia of the vulva.

The labia majora are homologous to the male scrotum.

Etymology
Labia majora is the Latin plural for big ("major") lips; the singular is labium majus. The Latin term labium/labia is used in anatomy for a number of usually paired parallel structures, but in English it is mostly applied to two pairs of parts of female external genitals (vulva)—labia majora and labia minora. Labia majora are commonly known as the outer lips, while labia minora (Latin for small lips), which run alongside between them, are referred to as the inner lips. Traditionally, to avoid confusion with other lip-like structures of the body, the labia of female genitals were termed by anatomists in Latin as labia majora (or minora) pudendi.

Embryology
Embryologically, they develop from labioscrotal folds. It means that they develop in the female foetus from the same previously sexually undifferentiated anatomical structure as the scrotum, the sac of skin below the penis in males.

The same process of sex differentiation concerns other male and female reproductive organs (see List of related male and female reproductive organs), with some organs of both sexes developing similar, yet not identical, structure and functions (like the gonads - male testicles and female ovaries, like male and female urethras, erectile corpus cavernosum penis and prepuce in the penis (foreskin) and the corpus cavernosum clitoridis in the clitoris and (clitoral hood) and their frenula). But other male and female sex organs become absolutely different and unique, like the internal female genitalia.

The scrotum and labia majora develop to have both similarities and crucial differences. Like the scrotum, labia majora after puberty may become of a darker color than the skin outside them, and, similarly, also grow pubic hair on their external surface (the female genitals on accompanying photos are shaved to show their structure clearer). But, during sexual differentiation of the foetus, labioscrotal folds in the males normally fuse longitudinally in the middle, forming a sack for male gonads (testicles) to descend into it from the pelvis, while in the females these folds normally do not fuse, forming the two labia majora and the pudendal cleft between them. Female gonads (ovaries) do not descend from the pelvis, thus the structure of labia majora may seem simpler (just fatty tissue covered with skin) and of lesser significance for functioning of the female body as a whole than the scrotum with testicles for males. The ridge or groove remaining of the fusion can be traced on the scrotum.

In some cases of intersex with disorders of sex development male/female genitalia may look ambiguous for either gender with phallus too small for a typical penis yet too big for a clitoris, with external urethral opening in an atypical location, and with labia/scrotum fully or partially fused but without descended gonads in them. Undescended testicles, though, may also occur in otherwise generally healthy male infants.

Anatomy
The labia majora constitute the lateral boundaries of the pudendal cleft, which contains the labia minora, interlabial sulci, clitoral hood, clitoral glans, frenulum clitoridis, the Hart's Line, and the vulval vestibule, which contains the external openings of the urethra and the vagina. Each labium majus has two surfaces, an outer, pigmented and covered with strong, pubic hair; and an inner, smooth and beset with large sebaceous follicles. The labia majora are covered with squamous epithelium. Between the two there is a considerable quantity of areolar tissue, fat, and a tissue resembling the dartos tunic of the scrotum, besides vessels, nerves, and glands. The labia majora are thicker in front, and form the anterior labial commissure where they meet below the mons pubis. Posteriorly, they are not really joined, but appear to become lost in the neighboring integument, ending close to, and nearly parallel to, each other. Together with the connecting skin between them, they form another commissure the posterior labial commissure which is also the posterior boundary of the pudendum. The interval between the posterior commissure and the anus, from 2.5 to 3 cm in length, constitutes the perineum. The anterior region of the perineum is known as the urogenital triangle which separates it from the anal region. Between the labia majora and the inner thighs are the labiocrural folds. Between the labia majora and labia minora are the interlabial sulci. Labia majora atrophy after menopause.

Use in grafting
The fat pad of the labia majora can be used as a graft, often as a so-called "Martius labial fat pad graft", and can be used, for example, in urethrolysis.

See also
 Femalia
 Labia pride

References

External links

 Labia Majora Medical Definition

Mammal female reproductive system

de:Schamlippe#Die großen (äußeren) Schamlippen